CISN-FM (103.9 MHz, 103.9 CISN Country) is a radio station that broadcasts from Edmonton, Alberta, Canada. It is owned by Corus Entertainment, which also operates CHED, CHQT and CKNG-FM. The station has a country format, playing both current hits and past favourites. CISN is one of the longest broadcasting FM stations in Edmonton. CISN's studios are located on 84th Street in downtown Edmonton, while its transmitter is located near Anthony Henday Drive in eastern Edmonton.

As of Feb 28, 2021, CISN is the 7th-most-listened-to radio station in the Edmonton market according to a PPM data report released by Numeris.

Rebroadcasters
CISN also operates on a number of low-power FM transmitters in some areas of Canada.

Alberta

British Columbia

Newfoundland and Labrador

Awards
CISN-FM was the winner of the Canadian Country Music Association's Annual Country Station of the Year (Major Market Category) five times since the award's 2000 creation, having won in 2003, 2004, 2009, 2010, 2012 and 2016.

References

External links
103.9 CISN Country
 

Isn
Isn
Isn
Radio stations established in 1982
1982 establishments in Alberta